Diego Lamelas (born Montevideo, 14 December 1972) is a Uruguayan rugby union player. He plays as a hooker.

Lamelas was a member of Argentinian team of Asociación Alumni. He was a senior Uruguayan rugby union player and a regular member of Uruguay national rugby union team. He played twice at the Rugby World Cup finals, in 1999 and 2003. At the first time, he played three games, and at the second, four, scoring a try. Lamelas ended his international career, who lasted from 1998 to 2006, with 51 caps for his side, with 6 tries scored and 28 points in aggregate. Lamelas also played at the unsuccessful campaign for the 2007 Rugby World Cup finals.

Notes

1972 births
Living people
Rugby union players from Montevideo
Uruguayan rugby union players
Rugby union hookers
Asociación Alumni players
Uruguay international rugby union players